Estero Island is an island located in Lee County, Florida, on the Gulf coast of Southwest Florida.  It is bordered by San Carlos Island to the north and Big Carlos Pass to the south.  The Matanzas Pass Bridge is on the northern end of the island and connects Estero Island over Matanzas Pass to San Carlos Island.  The Big Carlos Bridge (part of the Bonita Beach Causeway) connects the southern end of the island to Black Island (the northern limit of the city of Bonita Springs).

Communities
The island is part of the town of Fort Myers Beach.

References

External links

Gulf Coast barrier islands of Florida
Islands of Lee County, Florida
Beaches of Lee County, Florida
Beaches of Florida
Islands of Florida